The zig-zag eel (Mastacembelus armatus), also known as the tire-track eel, tire-track spiny eel or marbled spiny eel, is a species of ray-finned, spiny eels belonging to the genus Mastacembelus (Scopoli, 1777) of the family Mastacembelidae, and is native to the riverine fauna of India, Bangladesh, Pakistan, Sri Lanka, Thailand, Vietnam, Indonesia and other parts of Southeast Asia.  The species was described as Macrognathus armatus by Lacepède in 1800.<ref name = CofF>{{Cof record|spid=24161|title='Macrognathus armatus|access-date=13 November 2019}}</ref> Other common names for this popular aquarium species are leopard spiny eel and white-spotted spiny eel. This species is not only a popular aquarium fish but also as a food fish in its country of origin.

DescriptionMastacembelus armatus is a large elongated fish that has a snake-like body without pelvic fins.   Its anal and dorsal fins are elongated and are connected to the caudal fin. The dorsal fin is preceded by numerous spines. The back is dark beige in color while the head is silver-beige.  The body's color is dull brown and the belly is a lighter shade of brown. The body may also be marked with brown circular patterns. The body also have one to three darker longitudinal zigzag lines that connect to form a distinct reticulated pattern that is restricted to the dorsal two-thirds of the body.  The eyes have brown stripes running laterally through them.Mastacembelus armatus can reach up to 36" (91 cm) in its natural habitat but does not usually exceed 20" (51 cm) in captivity.

Despite its eel-like appearance, Mastacembelus armatus is not considered a true eel.

HabitatMastacembelus armatus are nocturnal fish that thrive in highland streams, lowland wetlands, still waters, coastal marshes and rivers with sandy or rocky riverbeds and heavy vegetation.  They are common during the tropical summer months and will dwell in canals, lakes and other floodplain areas during the flood season.

In the aquarium

Aquarium maintenanceMastacembelus armatus are bottom dwellers and occasional substrate diggers and burrowers. Those that are 6" (15 cm) long do well in tanks measuring 36" (91 cm) with a capacity of 35 gallons (132 liters).  However, larger M. armatus   necessitate aquariums measuring at least 48" (122 cm) with 55 gallons (209 liters) capacity. 
Zig-zag eels do well in freshwater or slightly brackish aquatic environments (produced by adding two teaspoons of sea salt (not iodated) per 2 gallons of water) with 6 to 25 dH water hardness, with pH readings ranging from 6 to 8, and temperatures that are maintained between 73 and 81 °F (23 to 27 °C).M. armatus'' tend to uproot plants and disturb decorations.

Compatibility
Although zig-zag eels are often combined with medium to large-sized gouramis, knifefish, danios, loaches, Loricariids, eartheaters, acaras, Cichlasomines and Asian catfishes in a community fish aquarium, they are not normally mixed with small-sized fish, because tire track eels are observed to prey upon smaller fish. Mixing them with fish belonging to the same species is also not recommended. This is because they are aggressive to members of the same fish family but peaceful to other fish species with similar care level requirements, size and temperament.

Feeding
Being nocturnal carnivores, zig-zag eels forage on benthic insect larvae, earthworms, blackworms and some submerged plant material.  In an aquarium setting, they require live foods in their diet such as live fish, tubifex worms, brine shrimps, mosquito larvae, frozen bloodworms, cyclops, krill and ocean plankton.

Reproduction
Male and female zig-zag eels are only distinguishable when mature.  Females are normally plumper than males.  Although their fecundity in the wild is high, there are no known successful breeding programs in captivity.

References

Zig-zag eel
Freshwater fish of South Asia
Freshwater fish of Southeast Asia
tire track eel
Taxa named by Bernard Germain de Lacépède